Hengaw or Hengaw Organization for Human Rights is a Norway-based Kurdish human rights NGO founded in 2016 for the purpose of reporting on the human rights violations against Kurds in Iran. Their reporting on the treatment of Kolbars has been used by the United Nations. Since 2022, their reporting on the crackdown of protesters in Iranian Kurdistan during the Mahsa Amini protests in 2022 was used by various international media outlets.

References 

Organisations based in Trondheim
Human rights abuses in Iran
Human rights in Kurdistan